Martyn Forde is an Olympic-swimmer from Barbados. He swam for Barbados at the 2008 Olympics and the 2007 World Championships.

He holds the Barbadian Records in the short-course 50 and 100 freestyles.

External links
 Forde's bio from the 2008 Olympics website.
Forde's bio on www.sports-reference.com
Bajan to swim in Beijing. CBC.bb; retrieved 2009-06-12.

1985 births
Living people
Canadian people of Barbadian descent
Barbadian male swimmers
Canadian male freestyle swimmers
Olympic swimmers of Barbados
Swimmers from Toronto
Swimmers at the 2008 Summer Olympics
Swimmers at the 2011 Pan American Games
Pan American Games competitors for Barbados
Competitors at the 2006 Central American and Caribbean Games
University of Toronto alumni
Black Canadian sportspeople